Camila Escribens nació el 2 de setiembre de 1998 en Lima Perú, radicó gran parte de su vida en Fresno- California, por lo que adquirió la nacionalidad estadounidense, representando a la comunidad peruana en los Estados Unidos,es modelo y ganadora de un concurso de belleza donde fue coronada como primera finalista en Miss Perú 2019 y Miss Perú 2021.

Pageantry 
Camila was born in Lima and lived in Fresno, California. She represented the Peruvian community in the United States as Miss Peru USA at the national pageant of Miss Perú 2019 held on October 21, 2018, in her hometown. She became the first runner-up in the contest and earned the title of "Miss Grand Peru 2019". It was originally believed she would succeed the dethroned Anyella Grados as the new Miss Peru following controversies and scandals after a series of events. However, due to her indirect participation of some of these events, it was decided she would retain her original title as a new contest was to be held as a fresh start to forget what had happened to the dethroned candidates and their ambassador roles. On Sunday, May 10, 2020, it was announced on Instagram that Escribens would be representing Perú as Miss Perú Supranational.

References

Living people
Miss Peru
Peruvian female models
Peruvian beauty pageant winners
Peruvian people of German descent
1998 births